This is a list of street legal production motorcycles ranked by acceleration from a standing start, limited to 0 to 60 mph times of under 3.5 seconds, and -mile times of under 12 seconds. Concept, custom, modified, and one-off motorcycles of any kind are not listed, nor are racing-only motorcycles. The widely varying testing methodologies mean that, even between identical motorcycles, the acceleration times vary. Some of these differences include: rider skill and launching technique, measuring equipment, track surface conditions, weather, air temperature, and altitude.

By 0–60 mph, 3.5 seconds or less
For comparison, an object in free fall, without any air resistance, near the Earth's surface accelerates from 0–100 km/h in 2.83 seconds and from 0–60 mph in 2.73 seconds. 
Note model year 2013-2016 documented 0-60 mph times for Ducati Diavel is marked 2.5-2.8 seconds depending on source. If more reliable/consistent sources become available please update.

By quarter-mile time, 12 seconds or less

Time from standing start ending at 1/4 of a mile (1320 feet).

In 1971 Cycle World said the Norton Dunstall 810 (11.9 seconds), a Norton Commando modified by a third party but available to the public as a production, not bespoke, motorcycle, was the first production motorcycle with a quarter-mile time under 12 seconds in that magazine's testing history. In 2012, the same magazine said the 1972 Kawasaki H2 Mach IV (11.95 seconds) was the first under 12 seconds.

Notes
European manufacturers quote 0–100 km/h (62 mph), whereas U.S. manufacturers quote 0–60 mph (97 km/h). This leads to discrepancies in comparisons.
 The 1971 Norton Dunstall was the first "production motorcycle" to achieve a quarter-mile time under 12 seconds in Cycle Worlds testing, according to that magazine at that time. Later, in 2012, Cycle World said the 1972 Kawasaki H2 Mach IV was the first such production bike. The Norton Dunstall began as a factory-produced Norton motorcycle and was modified at the shops of Paul Dunstall and built in very limited numbers to satisfy Homologation  rules for road racing while the Kawasaki Mach IV was a production motorcycle built in a manufacturing plant and produced in large numbers.

References

Lists of motorcycles
Transport-related lists of superlatives